Delanghe is a surname. Notable people with the surname include: 

 Angele Delanghe (died 1971), Belgian fashion designer
 Maxime Delanghe (born 2001), Belgian footballer